Platytes atlantivolella is a moth in the family Crambidae. It was described by Zerny in 1935. It is found in Morocco (the High Atlas).

References

Crambini
Moths described in 1935
Moths of Africa